Baloz or bajloz is a legendary character in Albanian mythology and folklore, who appears as an antagonist of the Albanian legendary heroes. He sometimes is described as a sea monster.

Etymology 

Maximilian Lambertz suggested that the word derived from Italian bailo, the title of the Venetian ambassador to the Ottomans.

Literally, the word seems to have originated from the Albanian blozë (soot), referring to baloz's armour color, or maybe from Turkish word "balyoz" meaning "hammer", maybe due to the hammers of war the baloz carried.

Folklore 

Baloz (as a character) has been found in many Albanian myths and legends about fighting against the Albanian nobles such as: Muji, Halili, Gjergj Elez Alia and Constantin. The monster is found in the Albanian Songs of the Frontier Warriors.

Detailed descriptions have been found in a collection of Albanian myths named Ancient Albanian Tales collected and rewritten by Dhimitër Pasko.

Baloz Sedelija was a Slavic warrior in Albanian folklore. Another character was Baloz(i) i Zi.

References 

Albanian folklore
Albanian legendary creatures